The Zaječar District is one of nine administrative districts of Southern and Eastern Serbia. It expands to the eastern parts of Serbia. It has a population of 119,967 inhabitants, according to the 2011 census results. The administrative center is the city of Zaječar.

Municipalities
It encompasses the municipalities of:
 Boljevac
 Zaječar
 Knjaževac
 Sokobanja

Demographics

According to the last official census done in 2011, the Zaječar District has 119,967 inhabitants.

Ethnic groups
Ethnic groups of the district according to the 2011 census results:
 Serbs = 105,231 (87.72%)
 "Vlachs" (Romanians) = 6,561 (5.47%)
 Roma = 2,042 (1.70%)
 Macedonians = 234 (0.20%)
 Bulgarians = 223 (0.19%)
 Montenegrins = 140 (0.12%)
 Croats = 119 (0.10%)

History
Felix Romuliana (Galerius' Palace) in modern Gamzigrad is the birthplace of the Roman Emperor Gaius Galerius Valerius Maxmimianus, in late 3rd century and early 4th century. Because of its archaeological findings, Gamzigrad ranks among the most important late Roman sites in the world. The rich historic material (jewelry, mosaics, coins, tools, arms) found here is a treasure trove of Roman civilization of the 4th century A.D.

Roman Emperors
Three Roman Emperors were born in the Zaječar District:
 Galerius ruled 293–311
 Maximinus II ruled 305–312
 Licinius ruled 308–324

Economy
Trends of economic development of the Zaječar District lead from crafts and semi-industrial processing of agricultural products over coal exploitation (textile factory, leather factory, brewery, quartz sand mine and coal mine) to the modern plants and high output rate.

See also
 Administrative divisions of Serbia
 Districts of Serbia

References

Note: All official material made by the Government of Serbia is public by law. Information was taken from the official website.

External links

 Зајечарски управни округ (Serbian)

 
Districts of Southern and Eastern Serbia